Richard Knight (by 1518 – 1555 or later), of Chichester, Sussex, was an English politician.

Knight was Mayor of Chichester for 1554 and elected Member of Parliament for Chichester in 1555.

References

Year of death missing
Mayors of Chichester
English MPs 1555
Year of birth uncertain